Fahad Sabeel (Arabic:فهد سبيل) (born 10 March 1989) is an Emirati footballer. He currently plays for Al Bataeh.

External links

References

Emirati footballers
1989 births
Living people
Al-Nasr SC (Dubai) players
Baniyas Club players
Al-Shaab CSC players
Al Urooba Club players
Fujairah FC players
Al-Ittihad Kalba SC players
Al Bataeh Club players
UAE First Division League players
UAE Pro League players
Association football fullbacks